Cevallos is a location in the Tungurahua Province, Ecuador. It is the seat of the Cevallos Canton.

References 
 www.inec.gov.ec
 www.ame.gov.ec

External links 
 Map of the Tungurahua Province

Populated places in Tungurahua Province